Kaleh Jub (also Romanized as Kaleh Jūb, Kaleh Jūvī, Kaleh Jūy, Kalleh Joo, and Koleh Jūb) is a village in Khaveh-ye Shomali Rural District, in the Central District of Delfan County, Lorestan Province, Iran. At the 2006 census, its population was 33, in 8 families.

References 

Towns and villages in Delfan County